Paradrillia melvilli is a species of sea snail, a marine gastropod mollusc in the family Horaiclavidae.

Description
The length of the shell attains 8 mm.

Distribution
This marine species occurs from the Persian Gulf to Northwest India

References

 Liu J.Y. [Ruiyu] (ed.). (2008). Checklist of marine biota of China seas. China Science Press. 1267 pp.

External links
 Biolib.cz: image of a shell of Paradrillia melvilli
 

melvilli
Gastropods described in 1969